Blue lotus may refer to:

 Nymphaea caerulea, a water lily in the genus Nymphaea that was known to the Ancient Egyptian civilizations
 Nymphaea nouchali,  a water lily of genus Nymphaea that is native to southern and eastern parts of Asia
 The Blue Lotus, a 1936 book in the Tintin series